Robinsonekspedisjonen 2011, is the eleventh season of the Norwegian version of the Swedish show Expedition Robinson. This season premiered on September 4, 2011 and finished in early December. The main twist this season is that the contestants will be divided into two tribes known as Gamle (Old) and Unge (Young) based on their ages with those in Gamle being age forty and up and those in Unge being under the age of thirty.

Finishing order

The game

: As his team won the reward challenge and with it his duel, Arild was awarded individual immunity.
: Though Gabriel was initially not chosen by either tribe, he was given the choice to pick someone else that would be eliminated instead of him. Before he could make his decision Christina stated that she would take his place so he wouldn't have to choose.
: Prior to the vote the members of the South Team were asked to vote for two people that they thought deserved to be eliminated. As Anita was the person voted out of the tribe the two people she voted for, Even and Jon, were also told that they too would be excluded from the tribe. The three were then told that they would live together in exile until one of them left the competition.
: Following the vote at tribal council, Bård Anders and Marianne took part in a duel in which the winner would get immunity and a spot in the merge tribe while the loser would be eliminated from the game. 
: When Lillan won immunity in episode eight she also won two extra votes at tribal council. 
: There was no vote at tribal council in episode nine as the three contestants marked by the mole correctly identified the mole as Nikolina.
: In episode ten the contestants were initially voting for which contestant they wanted to take part in an elimination duel. As a result of this vote Hans-Olaf and Nicolas were forced to compete in said duel. Hans-Olaf won the duel so Nicolas was eliminated.
: In episode eleven Hans-Olaf won a positive twist (two extra votes), as did Lillan (the right to take away someone's vote), while Morten received a negative twist (the loss of his right to vote).

Voting History

 Arild and Beatrice's tribes were both competing in a duel while their tribes were competing for reward. Whoever's tribe won the challenge would win immunity while the one whose tribe lost would be eliminated.
 At the first tribal council, Arild was given immunity as his tribe won the first duel.
 Though Gabriel was initially not chosen by either tribe, he was given the choice to pick someone else that would be eliminated instead of him. Before he could make his decision Christina stated that she would take his place so he wouldn't have to choose.
 Prior to the vote the members of the South Team were asked to vote for two people that they thought deserved to be eliminated. As Anita was the person voted out of the tribe the two people she voted for, Even and Jon, were also told that they too would be excluded from the tribe. The three were then told that they would live together in exile until one of them left the competition. 
 Following the vote at tribal council, Bård Anders and Marianne took part in a duel in which the winner would get immunity and a spot in the merge tribe while the loser would be eliminated from the game.
 When Lillan won immunity in episode eight she also won two extra votes at tribal council. 
At the ninth tribal council, both Bård Anders and Hans Christian received five votes. As Bård Anders received more votes in the re-vote he was eliminated. 
 There was no vote at tribal council in episode nine as the three contestants marked by the mole correctly identified the mole as Nikolina.
  In episode ten the contestants were initially voting for which contestant they wanted to take part in an elimination duel. As a result of this vote Hans-Olaf and Nicolas were forced to compete in said duel. Hans-Olaf won the duel so Nicolas was eliminated.
 In episode eleven Hans-Olaf won a positive twist (two extra votes), as did Lillan (the right to take away someone's vote), while Morten received a negative twist (the loss of his right to vote).
 Prior to voting beginning at the twelfth tribal council, Hans Christian used his hidden immunity idol. This meant that no one could vote for Hans Christian.

Reference List

External links
(Official Site)

 2011
2011 Norwegian television seasons
Norwegian television series